Zhang Lei may refer to:

Zhang Lei (actor) (born 1972), Chinese actor
Zhang Lei (singer) (born 1981), Chinese singer
Zhang Lei (investor) (born 1972), Chinese investor

Sportspeople
Zhang Lei (fencer) (born 1979), Chinese foil fencer
Zhang Lei (cyclist) (born 1981), Chinese cyclist
Zhang Lei (volleyball) (born 1985), Chinese volleyball player
Zhang Lei (water polo) (born 1988), Chinese water polo player
Zhang Lei (table tennis), Chinese table tennis player
Zhang Lei (footballer) (born 1985), Chinese football player 
Zhang Lei (referee) (born 1982), Chinese football referee